Carl Friedrich Fuchs (28 October 1803 – 5 March 1874) was a German lithographer and photographer based in Hamburg.

Life 
Born in Bordeaux, Fuchs grew up in Hamburg at the beginning of the 19th century under difficult family circumstances. At the age of 25, he came to Frankfurt via stations that were not always known. There, he learned the art of lithography from Fr Emile Simon from Strasbourg. A little later he married Simon's daughter and Frenchified his first name.

Lithographic Institute of Charles Fuchs 
Around 1832, Fuchs opened a lithographic institute in Hamburg, since the privilege of the Speckter family had fallen in 1828 to be the only ones allowed to produce lithographs. Fuchs quickly became one of the most important lithographers in Hamburg, alongside the brothers Christoffer, Cornelius and Peter Suhr.

After Fuchs' death in 1874 at the age of 69, a son-in-law continued to run the lithographic establishment until shortly after the turn of the century. Numerous views of the city and buildings of Hamburg, popularly known as "Hamburgensie", bear the inscription "Druck des Lith. Inst. v. Ch. Fuchs, Hamburg" and are still preserved today. Friedrich Wilhelm Graupenstein had his lithographs printed at the institute, so that portraits of many Hamburg personalities also bear the inscription.

Portraits 
 Porträt Charles Fuchs, Ch. Fuchs (Hamburg), Lithographische Anstalt, (Faktischer Entstehungsort:) Hamburg um 1840, Lithograph, 308 × 253 mm, (online Digitaler Porträtindex, Bildarchiv Foto Marburg)
 Porträt Charles Fuchs, Ch. Fuchs (Hamburg), Lithographische Anstalt, (Faktischer Entstehungsort:) Hamburg um 1840, Lithograph, 308 × 253 mm, (online Digitaler Porträtindex, Bildarchiv Foto Marburg)

References

Further reading 
 HSH Nordbank AG (ed.), Jan Zimmermann: Charles Fuchs, mit Objektiv und Pinsel. Hamburg in early photographs by Charles Fuchs. (Exhibition period 18 July to 21 November 2003.)
 Ursula Peters: Stylistic History of Photography in Germany, 1839–1900. 424 pages with 410 illustrations. DuMont Buchverlag, Cologne 1979.
 Dr. E. Zimmermann: Geschichte der Lithographie in Hamburg. Festschrift for the Secular Celebration of the Invention of Lithography in Hamburg, July 1896. (Edited by the Committee for the Exhibition and Festschrift and written on its behalf). Self-published by the Committee for the Secular Celebration, Carl Griese, Hamburg 1896, pp. 50 ff.
 Hamburgisches Künstler-Lexikon, Die bildenden Künstler vol. 1, edited by a committee of the Verein für Hamburgische Geschichte Hoffmann und Campe, Hamburg, 1854, (online Hamburg Staats- und Universitätsbibliothek).

External links 

19th-century German photographers
German lithographers
1803 births
1874 deaths
Artists from Hamburg